Mikalay Yawhenavich Signevich (born 20 February 1992) is a Belarusian professional footballer who plays as a forward for Greek Super League 2 club Apollon Smyrnis.

Club career
On 8 September 2020, he signed with Russian Premier League club FC Khimki.

On 28 September 2020, he returned to BATE Borisov.

Ferencváros
On 16 June 2020, he became champion with Ferencváros by beating Budapest Honvéd FC at the Hidegkuti Nándor Stadion on the 30th match day of the 2019–20 Nemzeti Bajnokság I season.

International career
Signevich made his debut for the senior national side of his country on 15 November 2014, in the away match against Spain in a UEFA Euro 2016 qualifier, coming on as a second-half substitute for Sergei Kornilenko.

Honours
BATE Borisov
Belarusian Premier League champion: 2014, 2015, 2016, 2017, 2018
Belarusian Cup winner: 2014–15, 2020–21
Belarusian Super Cup winner: 2014

Ferencváros
Nemzeti Bajnokság I champion: 2018–19

International goal
Scores and results list Belarus' goal tally first.

References

External links 
 
 
 Profile at Dinamo Brest website

1992 births
Living people
Sportspeople from Brest, Belarus
Belarusian footballers
Association football forwards
Belarus international footballers
Belarusian expatriate footballers
Expatriate footballers in Greece
Expatriate footballers in Hungary
Belarusian expatriate sportspeople in Greece
Belarusian expatriate sportspeople in Hungary
Expatriate footballers in Russia
FC Dynamo Brest players
FC BATE Borisov players
Platanias F.C. players
Ferencvárosi TC footballers
FC Khimki players
Apollon Smyrnis F.C. players
Super League Greece players
Nemzeti Bajnokság I players
Russian Premier League players